Banie  (formerly ) is a village in Gryfino County, West Pomeranian Voivodeship, in north-western Poland. It is the seat of the gmina (administrative district) called Gmina Banie.

The village has a population of 2,000.

Gallery

References

External links
Jewish Community in Banie on Virtual Shtetl

Villages in Gryfino County